Juan Alonso Hernández Hernández (born 15 November 1960) is a Mexican politician from the Institutional Revolutionary Party. From 2002 to 2003 he served as Deputy of the LVIII Legislature of the Mexican Congress representing Hidalgo.

References

1960 births
Living people
Politicians from Hidalgo (state)
Institutional Revolutionary Party politicians
21st-century Mexican politicians
Deputies of the LVIII Legislature of Mexico
Members of the Chamber of Deputies (Mexico) for Hidalgo (state)